Pupillaea aperta, common name the mantled keyhole limpet, is a species of sea snail, a marine gastropod mollusk in the family Fissurellidae, the keyhole limpets.

Description
The size of the shell varies between 23 mm and 50 mm.

Distribution
This marine species occurs off Namibia to North Transkei, South Africa.

References

 Kilburn, R.N. & Rippey, E. (1982) Sea Shells of Southern Africa. Macmillan South Africa, Johannesburg, xi + 249 pp. page(s): 36 
 Steyn, D.G. & Lussi, M. (1998) Marine Shells of South Africa. An Illustrated Collector’s Guide to Beached Shells. Ekogilde Publishers, Hartebeespoort, South Africa, ii + 264 pp. page(s): 12
 Petit R.E. (2009) George Brettingham Sowerby, I, II & III: their conchological publications and molluscan taxa. Zootaxa 2189: 1–218.

External links
 
 Branch, G.M. et al. (2002). Two Oceans. 5th impression. David Philip, Cate Town & Johannesburg

Fissurellidae
Gastropods described in 1825